Events in the year 1890 in Portugal. There were 951,000 registered voters in the country.

Incumbents
Monarch: Carlos I 
President of the Council of Ministers: José Luciano de Castro (until 14 January), António de Serpa Pimentel (from 14 January to 14 October), João Crisóstomo de Abreu e Sousa (from 14 October)

Events
 11 January - British Ultimatum
 Creation of A Portuguesa, with lyrics by Henrique Lopes de Mendonça and music by Alfredo Keil.
 30 March - Legislative election
 14 August - Opening of Coliseu dos Recreios.
 15 October - "Birth" of Álvaro de Campos, one of Fernando Pessoa's heteronyms.
 Establishment of the Niassa Company.

Births
 6 March - Francisco José Caeiro, politician (died 1956)
 19 May - Mário de Sá-Carneiro, poet, writer (died 1916)
 29 September - Maria Matos, actress (died 1952)
 12 October - Luís de Freitas Branco, composer, musicologist, professor of music (died 1955)
 20 October - Luís de Almeida Braga, writer, politician (died 1970)

Deaths
 2 April - António da Silva Porto, trader, explorer (born 1817)
 18 April - Caetano da Costa Alegre, poet (born 1864)
 1 June - Camilo Castelo Branco, writer (born 1825)
 28 June - Józef Karol Konrad Chełmicki, general (born 1814 in Poland)
 24 September - João Afonso da Costa de Sousa de Macedo, 1st Duke of Albuquerque (born 1815)
 João de Lemos, journalist, poet, dramatist (born 1819)

See also
List of colonial governors in 1890#Portugal

References

 
Years of the 19th century in Portugal
Portugal